Seyyed Ahmadi may refer to:
 Seyyed Ahmadi, Fars
 Seyyed Ahmadi, Hormozgan